Ampromides are a class of opioid drugs which includes:

 Diampromide
 Phenampromide
 Propiram